John Hughes may refer to:

Entertainment

Art
John Hughes (art director) (1882–1954), American art director
John Hughes (ceramicist) (1935–2013), Welsh ceramicist
John Hughes (sculptor) (1865–1941), Irish sculptor

Film and television
John Hughes (filmmaker) (1950–2009), American film director, writer, and producer
John Hughes, character in British TV series Peaky Blinders

Music
John Hughes (1872–1914), Welsh composer of Calon Lân and other hymn-tunes
John Hughes (1873–1932), Welsh composer of Cwm Rhondda and other hymn-tunes
John Hughes (Irish musician) (born 1950), Irish musician and manager of The Corrs
John Hughes III (born 1976), American musician and founder of Hefty Records

Writing
John Hughes (poet) (1677–1720), English poet
John Hughes (1790–1857), English author
John Ceiriog Hughes (1832–1887), Welsh poet
John Hughes (writer) (born 1961), Australian essayist

Military
John Arthur Hughes (1880–1955), American Medal of Honor recipient
John H. Hughes (general), U.S. Army major general
John Gethin Hughes (1866–1954), New Zealand law clerk and military leader
John T. Hughes (Confederate officer) (1817–1862), colonel in the Missouri State Guard and Confederate Army

Politics
John Hughes (Middlesex MP), English Member of Parliament for Middlesex, 1542–1552
John Hughes (Pennsylvania politician) (1711–1772), colonial Pennsylvania politician 
John Bristow Hughes (1817–1881), grazier, developer and politician in the early days of the Colony of South Australia
John Hughes (New South Wales politician) (1857–1912), Australian politician
John T. Hughes (politician) (1873–1921), American politician from Arizona, member of the 1st Arizona state legislature
John Chambers Hughes (1891–1971), United States diplomat; ambassador to NATO
John H. Hughes (politician) (1904–1972), New York state senator
John Hughes (Coventry North East MP) (1925–2009), MP for Coventry North East
John Owen Hughes (died 1945), British businessman and politician in Hong Kong
John Hughes (British diplomat) (born 1947), British diplomat and Ambassador to Argentina

Sports
John Hughes (footballer, born 1855) (1855–1914), Cambridge University A.F.C. and Wales international footballer
John Hughes (footballer, born 1877) (1877–1950), Welsh international footballer, played for Liverpool
John Iorweth Hughes (born 1913), Welsh international footballer
John Hughes (footballer, born 1921) (1921–2003), English footballer, played for Birmingham City
John Hughes (footballer, born 1942), Welsh footballer, played for Chester City
John Hughes (footballer, born 1943) (1943–2022), Scottish footballer, played for Celtic 
John Hughes (footballer, born 1964), Scottish footballer and manager, played for Falkirk
John Hughes (soccer, born 1965), Canadian soccer player
John Hughes (cricketer, born 1971), English cricketer
John Hughes (cricketer, born 1825) (1825–1907), English cricketer
John Hughes (ice hockey, born 1954), Canadian ice hockey player
John Hughes (ice hockey, born 1988), Canadian ice hockey player
John Hughes (American football) (born 1988), American football player

Religion
John Hughes (archbishop) (1797–1864), American Roman Catholic
John Hughes (bishop of Croydon) (1908–2001), Church of England
John Hughes (bishop of Kensington) (1935–1994), Church of England
John Hughes (priest) (1924–2008), Leicester
John Hughes (theologian) (1979–2014), British scholar and Dean of Chapel and Chaplain at Jesus College, Cambridge
John Poole-Hughes (1916–1988), Bishop of South-West Tanganyika and Bishop of Llandaff

Other
John Hughes (architect) (1903–1977), British architect
John Hughes (businessman) (1814–1889), Welsh developer in Ukraine
John Hughes (computer scientist) (born 1958), Swedish academic 
John Hughes (counselor) (1945–2012), American pioneer in alcohol- and drug-prevention
John Hughes (editor) (1930–2022), Welsh-American editor of the Deseret News and adviser to Boutros Boutros-Ghali
John Hughes (lawman) (1855–1947), Texas Ranger and cowboy of the Old West
John Hughes (merchant) (1825–1885), father of John Hughes (New South Wales politician)
John Hughes (motor dealer) (born 1935), Australian businessman
John Hughes (neuroscientist) (born 1942), British scientist
John F. Hughes, American computer graphics researcher and textbook co-author
John G. Hughes (born 1953), Irish professor and Vice-Chancellor
John T. Hughes (intelligence officer) (1928–1992), U.S. Defense Intelligence Agency officer
John Wesley Hughes (1852–1932), founder of Kingswood College in the U.S.
John Hughes, Antigua and Barbuda, a town in Saint Mary Parish, Antigua and Barbuda

See also
Jonathan Hughes (disambiguation)
Jack Hughes (disambiguation)
Hughes (surname)